William Henry Kenny (1811 – 17 August 1880) was a member of the New Zealand Legislative Council from 26 May 1853 to 17 August 1880, when he died. He was buried at St Stephen's Cemetery in Parnell.

He was from Auckland. He was one of the first 13 members appointed to the Legislative Council.

References 

1811 births
1880 deaths
Members of the New Zealand Legislative Council
People from Auckland
Burials at St Stephen's Cemetery, Parnell
19th-century New Zealand politicians